IRIB TV4 (/ʃæbæke-je tʃɑhɑr/) is one of the 32 national television channels in Iran. Its slogan is "the channel of wisdom."

The channel is operated by IRIB and started broadcasting in April 1994, shortly after IRIB TV3 went on air in December 1993. The channel is known to be a more artistic and academic channel than its counterparts. It broadcasts documentaries, academic conferences, interviews with scholars, artistic movies, economic magazines, plays, and philosophical discussions.

Gholamreza Gholami is the current manager of the channel.

Original programming
 Asemaneshab (TV Show about Astronomy)
 Avay-e Irani
 Cinema 4
 Partove Danesh
 Do Ghadam Mande be Sobh (2 Steps To Morning) 2007
 Cinema Eghtebas
 Cinema Mavara
 Mostanade 4 (Documentary 4)
 Sahbaye Tasnim
 Ordibehesht
 Ertebate Irani (2009)
 Char Soogh
 Charkh
Tolou
 Charsooye Elm (Collection of Documentaries from Western Media)
 Marefat (TV Show about Islamic Philosophy)
 Yek Film Yek Tajrobe (Documentaries about Iranian Films and TV Series)
 Forje
 Parto

Broadcast
 Primeval (TV series) (2009)
 Alfred Hitchcock Presents (2013)
 Little Dorrit (TV series) (2020)
 Zoo (TV series) (2021)
 Agatha Christie's Poirot (2021)
 Sherlock Holmes (1984 TV series) (2021)
 Sherlock (TV series) (2021)

References

External links

IRIB TV4 Live streaming

1994 establishments in Iran
Television channels and stations established in 1994
Television stations in Iran
Persian-language television stations
Islamic Republic of Iran Broadcasting